Langhi is a surname. Notable people with the surname include:

 Dan Langhi (born 1977), American basketball player
 Michael Langhi (born 1985), Brazilian martial artist
 Zahra' Langhi, Libyan gender specialist, civil society strategist, and political activist

See also
 Langhian